The Lady Margaret Boat Club (abbreviated to "LMBC" and known as "Maggie") is the rowing club for members of St John's College, Cambridge, England. The club is named after Lady Margaret Beaufort, founder of the College.

History 

LMBC was founded in 1825 by twelve members of the College as the first college boat club in Cambridge. In its original rules, the Club was to "consist of eighteen contributing members, besides honorary ones", and all members had to be able to row. An early member was Patrick Colquhoun who in 1837 instigated the Colquhoun Sculls, in the year in which he won the Wingfield Sculls.

The greatest influence in the 1860s and 1870s was J. H. D. Goldie, who raised LMBC to the "Headship of the River", won the "Colquhoun Sculls", and stroked Cambridge four times. The Goldie Boathouse, used by the university crews, commemorates his services to Cambridge rowing as does the name of the university second VIII, officially known as the Goldie Crew (or Boat) and competes annually against Isis just before the University Boat Race. Another important name in LMBC history is LHK Bushe-Fox who had a long career with LMBC, becoming President of the Club in 1897. One of the greatest influences of the 20th century was Roy Meldrum who established the "Lady Margaret" style, which he detailed in his rowing books.

The Boathouse was opened in the May term of 1901. It was extended in the 1970s, and was the first boathouse to have a workshop for the boatman. In the early 1980s, when the college began to admit women, further modifications were made upstairs to create the women's changing rooms. The boathouse was extended further in 2000 to create more indoor training space. A shed is now being built to house the club's fours, which are currently racked outside.

The Club's heyday was in the late 1940s and 1950s. LMBC won the "Ladies Plate" in 1949 with a new course record. In 1950, they made 4 bumps to go "Head of the Mays", and stayed "Head" for five years. In 1951, Lady Margaret won the Grand at Henley Royal Regatta and had five members of the successful Cambridge crew, which also defeated Harvard and Yale in the United States.

Between 1975 and 1981, Lady Margaret were Head of the Lent Bumps for 26 consecutive days of racing, the longest continuous defence of the Lent Headship. LMBC took the men's May Headship on day 4 of the 2016 races (bumping Caius), the first time they had held the Headship since 1989. LMBC retained the Mays headship in 2017 and 2018.

In Lent Bumps 2017, LMBC took the men's Lents Headship on day 3 (bumping Downing), the first time they had held the Headship since 1990. LMBC retained the Lents headship in 2018, lost it in 2019, but regained it in 2020 and held it in 2022.

In March 2017, Lady Margaret's men's first boat represented the Cambridge colleges in the Men's Intercollegiate fixture at the Henley Boat Races against Oriel College, Oxford. Lady Margaret won with a verdict of 4 lengths.

Traditions 

Members of the club are well known for their scarlet jackets, which gave rise to the modern term blazer. Members with "First May Colours" are entitled to wear trim and gold buttons on their blazer, while "First Lent" or "Second May Colours" are entitled to wear silver buttons on their blazer.

The club is traditionally strong in the Lent and May CUCBC Bumps race. Due to its affiliation with St John's College, the club always fields many, often very successful, boats with first-time rowers during the first university term. Club members also often go to row with university lightweight and heavyweight crews to compete against Oxford.

The club motto has been "Si je puis" ("If I can") since 1825. The boat club song, Viva laeta, has a chorus that goes as follows:

Vive laeta, Margareta, Beatorum insulis; Si possimus, Fuerimus, Semper caput fluminis.

Although the music is printed in the boat club's history and the song is sung at every Boat Club Dinner, few members know the tune. Dinners are also known for more controversial songs (such as the infamous "M2 song" sung by all current and past members of the Second Men's May Bumps Crew).

Rivalry with Trinity College

St John's has long had a close rivalry with Trinity College. Every year, a strange tradition takes place during the Bumps Weeks in Lent and May term, known as the "Stomp". Crews gather on the College Backs every morning preceding the races. One crew at a time will stop at a lone tree, knock three times on its trunk and shout out the name of the crew that will be starting in front of them that day to be "bumped". The whole club then strolls through the backs towards arch-rivals Trinity. Once in Trinity College's great court, a standoff between the rival boat clubs occurs followed by a tackling session in which boat club members from each side attempt to "kidnap" members of the opposite club. If captured, one is put to shame by being bought breakfast in the rival college's hall.

Honours

Henley Royal Regatta

See also
University rowing (UK)
Henley Boat Race
University of Cambridge
University of Oxford

References

 Durack, John; Gilbert, George; Marks, Dr. John (2000). The Bumps: An Account of the Cambridge University Bumping Races 1827-1999 
 CUCBC (various years) - Lent and May Bumps programmes.

External links
Club Website

Rowing clubs of the University of Cambridge
Boat
1825 establishments in England
Sports organizations established in 1825
Rowing clubs of the River Cam
Rowing clubs in Cambridgeshire
Rowing clubs in England